Associação Atlética de Altos, commonly referred to as Altos, is a Brazilian professional club based in Altos, Piauí founded on 19 July 2013. It competes in the Campeonato Brasileiro Série C, the third tier of Brazilian football, as well as in the Campeonato Piauiense, the top flight of the Piauí state football league.

Altos is the top ranked team from Piauí in CBF's national club ranking, at 66th overall.

Stadium
They play their home games at Estádio Felipão, with a capacity of 4,000 people.

Honours
 Campeonato Piauiense
 Winners (3): 2017, 2018, 2021

 Campeonato Piauiense Second Division
 Winners (1): 2015

References

External links
 Official Site
 Altos on Globo Esporte

Associação Atlética de Altos
Association football clubs established in 2013
Football clubs in Piauí
Football clubs in Brazil
2013 establishments in Brazil